Babe Ruth (1895–1948) was an American baseball outfielder and pitcher who played 22 seasons in Major League Baseball (MLB), from 1914 to 1935.

Babe Ruth may also refer to:
Babe Ruth (band), a British rock band
Babe Ruth Award, a baseball award
Babe Ruth (film), a 1991 American drama film

See also
Babe Ruth's called shot, a famous home run
Babe Ruth League, a youth baseball program
Baby Ruth, a candy bar
The Babe Ruth Story, a 1948 biographical film